Richmond–Winton Road is a continuous  road route in the Richmond and Winton local government areas of Queensland, Australia. It is a state-controlled district road (number 5803) rated as a local road of regional significance (LRRS). It is also part of the inland freight network linking cattle properties to major freight routes on the Landsborough and Flinders highways.

Route description

Land use along this road is mainly stock grazing on native vegetation. There are no major intersections on this road.

Road condition
In July 2021 the Minister for Transport and Main Roads announced the following projects, funded by various other arrangements, for the road:
 Culvert replacement: $2.7 million to replace two culverts - completed December 2020.
 Progressive sealing: $3.3 million to seal over  - completion expected July 2021.
 Widen and seal: $13 million to seal  - completion expected mid 2022.
 Pave and seal: $5.39 million to seal  - completion expected July 2021.

As at April 2022 the road has approximately  single lane sealed, split into sections, and approximately  single lane unsealed.

Upgrade
A project to pave and seal two sections of road, at a cost of $10.27 million, was completed in June 2022. It is unclear if this is part of the projects announced in July 2021.

History

Richmond Downs pastoral run was established in 1864. The town was surveyed in 1882, and the railway arrived in 1904. Other pastoral runs were established in the area, and the town soon became the administrative centre for the district.

After a short attempt at settlement in 1866 the first European settler came to what is now Winton in  about 1875 to set up a shop and public house. Winton began as a town about 1878 when a group of businessmen decided that a town site proposed by the government further west was unsuitable. The proposed site became a ghost town and Winton became the administrative centre for the district.

Early roads were cut from both Richmond and Winton to provide access for wheeled vehicles to the pastoral runs and other settlements. Over time these tracks were improved and extended to eventually form a through road.

Modern usage
Although not yet fully sealed the road is used extensively by road trains carrying cattle, and by other large trucks conveying heavy goods.

References

Roads in Queensland